The year 2006 is the third year in the history of the Konfrontacja Sztuk Walki, a mixed martial arts promotion based in Poland. In 2006 Konfrontacja Sztuk Walki held 2 events beginning with, KSW V: Konfrontacja.

List of events

KSW V: Konfrontacja

KSW V: Konfrontacja was a mixed martial arts event held on June 3, 2006 at the Hotel Marriott in Warsaw, Poland.

Results

KSW VI: Konfrontacja

KSW VI: Konfrontacja was a mixed martial arts event held on October 14, 2006 at the Torwar Hall in Warsaw, Poland . Alistair Overeem was a special guest at the event.

Results

References

Konfrontacja Sztuk Walki events
2006 in mixed martial arts